Hahn is a German surname. Notable people with the surname include:

Alfred Hahn (1890–1964), American architect
André Hahn, German footballer
André Hahn (born 1963), German politician
Archie Hahn (1880–1955), American sprinter
Archie Hahn (actor) (born 1941), American actor
Arthur A. Hahn (1886–1959), American businessman and politician
August Hahn (1792–1863), German Protestant theologian
Bernard Hahn (1860–1931), American politician
Billy Hahn (born 1955), American basketball coach
Bob Hahn (1925–2009), American basketball player
Carl Hugo Hahn (1818–1895), German missionary in Namibia
Carl Wilhelm Hahn (1898–1982), German journalist and historian
Carl Wilhelm Hahn (1786–1835), German zoologist
Joe Hahn (born 1977), American musician, DJ, director and visual artist
Johannes Hahn (born 1957), Austrian politician
Dave Hahn (born 1961), American climber
David Hahn, American known as the "Radioactive Boy Scout"
David Hahn (American politician), 2006 Democratic candidate for Governor of Nebraska
David Hahn (cartoonist), American cartoonist
Dirk Meinerts Hahn (1804–1860), German captain
Don Hahn, American film producer
Edith Hahn Beer (1914–2009), Jewish Holocaust survivor
Erich Hahn (1891–1917), German flying ace
Erwin Hahn (1921–2016), American physicist, best known for his work on nuclear magnetic resonance (NMR)
Florian Hahn (born 1974), German politician
Frank Hahn (1925–2013), Cambridge economist
Hans Hahn (mathematician) (1879–1934), Austrian mathematician
Hans "Assi" Hahn, (1914–1982), German World War II fighter ace
Hermann Hahn (architect), (1873–1921) German architect
Hilary Hahn (born 1979), American violinist
J. Jerome Hahn (–1938), Justice of the Rhode Island Supreme Court
James Hahn (born 1950), American politician and 40th Mayor of Los Angeles
James Hahn (golfer), American golfer
Janice Hahn, American politician
Jerri Ariel Farias Hahn, Brazilian footballer
Jessica Hahn (born 1959), American model and actress
Jody Margolin Hahn, American television director
Jörg-Uwe Hahn (born 1956), German politician
Joseph Yuspa Nördlinger Hahn (died 1637), German rabbi
Kathryn Hahn (born 1974), American actress
Kenneth Hahn (1920–1997), American politician
Kimberly Hahn (born 1957), Catholic author and apologist
Kurt Hahn (1886–1974), German teacher and education reformer
Lloyd Hahn (1898–1983), American middle-distance runner
Marjorie Hahn (born 1948), American mathematician and tennis player
Martín Hahn (born 1964), Venezuelan telenovelas writer
Nikki Hahn (born 2002), American actress
Otto Hahn (1879–1968), German nuclear chemist, discoverer of nuclear fission, Nobel Prize winner (Chemistry 1944), founder of the Max-Planck-Society, peace activist
Otto Hahn (petrologist) (1828–1904), German petrologist
Philipp Matthäus Hahn (1739–1790), German priest and inventor
Reynaldo Hahn (1874–1947), Venezuelan-French composer
Riley Hahn, MasterChef Junior contestant
Rick Hahn (born 1971), American baseball executive
Robert A. Hahn (born 1945), American medical anthropologist and epidemiologist
Robert C. Hahn, American lawyer and politician
Scott Hahn (born 1957), American Catholic writer and apologist
Stephen Hahn (disambiguation)
Stephen Hahn (art dealer) (1921–2011), American art dealer and collector
Stephen Hahn (oncologist) (born 1960), American physician and Commissioner of Food and Drugs (US FDA)
Steven Hahn (born 1951), American academic historian
Walter (wrestler) (born 1987), Austrian wrestler
William Hahn (1829–1887), German painter
William John Hahn (1841–1902), American lawyer and politician
Wolfgang Hahn (1911–1998), German mathematician

See also 
Han (Chinese surname)
Han (Korean surname)

Surnames from nicknames
German-language surnames